Kashi Nath Pandey is an Indian politician. He was elected to the Lok Sabha, the lower house of the Parliament of India from the Padrauna, Uttar Pradesh as a member of the Indian National Congress.

References

External links
 Official Biographical Sketch in Lok Sabha Website

Indian National Congress politicians
Year of death missing
India MPs 1962–1967
India MPs 1957–1962